Cracow University of Technology is a public university located in central Kraków, Poland, established in 1946 and, as an institution of higher learning granted full autonomy in 1954.

Over 37,000 students graduated from the university to this day with degrees. Doctorate degrees were granted to 1200 persons and Habilitated degrees – to additional 300. The number of students admitted each year reaches 4500.

Organizational structure
Faculty of Architecture,
Faculty of Electrical and Computer Engineering
Faculty of Civil Engineering
Faculty of Environmental Engineering
Faculty of Chemical Engineering and Technology
Faculty of Mechanical Engineering
Faculty of Physics, Mathematics and Computer Science

Ranking
In a survey conducted by the Polish edition of Newsweek in 2008, Cracow University of Technology was selected as the best university in Poland. Another magazine, Wprost, ranked it 8th in 2015.

In 2017 Perspektywy ranked it 43rd among all Polish academic institutions.  Another magazine, Wprost, ranked it 8th in 2015. According to Webometrics, it is ranked 14th best in Poland.

Notable alumni

Nguyễn Thế Thảo
Marek Grechuta
Zdzisław Beksiński
Marta Ingarden
Tadeusz Parpan
Michał Życzkowski
Andrzej Mleczko
Jan Korzeniowski
Krzysztof Węgrzyn
Ryszard Jurkowski

Rectors
 Izydor Stella-Sawicki (1945–1948)
 Ludomir Sleńdziński (1954–1956)
 Bronisław Kopyciński (1956–1965)
 Kazimierz Sokalski (1965–1968)
 Jan Kaczmarek (1968)
 Jan Wątorski (1968–1972)
 Władysław Muszyński (1972–1975)
 Bolesław Kordas (1975–1981)
 Roman Ciesielski (1981–1982)
 Tadeusz Środulski (1982–1987)
 Władysław Muszyński (1987–1990)
 Józef Nizioł (1990–1996)
 Kazimierz Flaga (1996–2002)
 Marcin Chrzanowski (2002–2005)
 Józef Gawlik (2005–2008)
 Kazimierz Furtak (2008–2016)
 Jan Kazior (2016–2020)
 Andrzej Białkiewicz (2020-)

See also

List of universities in Poland
Science and technology in Poland

References

External links
Cracow University of Technology, home page 
Politechnika Krakowska, home page 

Tadeusz Kościuszko University of Technology
Engineering universities and colleges in Poland
Educational institutions established in 1946
1946 establishments in Poland